The can-can is a dance.

Can-Can may also refer to:

 Can Can (band), American punk rock band
 Can-Can (musical), a 1953 musical
 Can-Can (film), based on the musical
 Can Can, fragrance designed by Paris Hilton
 "Galop Infernal", a movement of Offenbach's Orpheus in the Underworld commonly associated with the dance
 "Can Can" (Bad Manners song), 1981 single by the band Bad Manners
 Can Can (album), a 2006 live album by Bad Manners